Pest are a band from South London, formerly signed to Ninja Tune, writing and playing music that mixes elements of funk, electronica, jazz and breakbeat.  The band consists of Ben Mallott (DJ and keyboards), Matt Chandler (guitar), Tom Marriott (trombone), Wayne Urquhart (cello) and Vesa Haapanen (drums).

Former band member Adrian Josey (aka Pasta/Saffrolla) worked as DJ, co-producer, lyricist and vocalist on albums Necessary Measures, All Out Fall Out, early singles, and distribution of the band's pre-signed white labels.

History
Chandler and Marriott grew up together in Matlock, Derbyshire, England. Chandler studied music in Liverpool, and Marriott in London where Marriott met the others and the band began. 

After releasing their first tracks on white labels, they were signed to Ninja Tune and in 2003 they released their debut album Necessary Measures, followed by their second in 2005 – All Out Fall Out.  Pest have toured extensively, headlining many UK venues such as Koko, Cargo and The 100 Club in London, The Tuesday Club in Sheffield, and many festivals across Europe including Les Transmusicales in Rennes, as well as completing a short tour of Japan in 2009, for which they independently released the limited edition EP Meanwhile Backstage.

Band members
Ben Mallott is an established exponent of techno with his live hardware-based shows, and has played such festivals and clubs as Bloc, Glade, Boomtown and Berghain (in Berlin).  A DJ, writer and producer, he has numerous releases through labels including Bonusround, Victim, Seed, Sleep Debt and Panic Bridge.

Matt Chandler’s work in recent years includes many projects with Youth (Martin Glover) for artists such as Poly Styrene and The Orb.  With a background in jazz, Matt has also written and self-released albums "After Midnight" (2009) and "It Goes Like This" (2011).

Tom Marriott has been a longtime member of the Bollywood Brass Band and he also plays with experimental improv band Snorkel (with releases through the label Slowfoot), and has a solo techno project under the moniker ‘Fedka The Irritant’.

Wayne Urquhart, a classically trained cellist, has played for Roots Manuva, Moby, David Gray, Kosheen, Mark Ronson and Jocelyn Brown among others, and is an experienced composer and dubbing mixer for TV, film and radio.

Vesa Haapanen is a producer, composer, teacher and multi-instrumentalist, and has collaborated for many years with Martin Newnham and plays/produces with many artists including The Hanging Baskets, Mystery Fax Machine, Sixto "Sugar man" Rodriguez and the band Leaving Atlantis whose 2011 debut album was released through Vesa’s own label Dental Records Music.

Discography

Albums
Necessary Measures (24 March 2003)
All Out Fall Out (12 September 2005)

Singles
"Slap on Tap" (3 December 2001)
"Jefferson Shuffle" (13 January 2003)
"Chicken Spit" (22 September 2003)
"Pat Pong" (18 July 2005)
"Wu Ju" (21 November 2005)
"Kill It" (date unknown)

Song appearances
 The song "Duke Kerb Crawler" was featured in the video game Tony Hawk's American Wasteland.
 A remix version of the song "Pat Pong" was featured in the racing game Blur.
 The song "Delucid" features in Juiced 2: Hot Import Nights
 The song "Chicken Spit" is featured in the Toonami original series IGPX.
 An edit of the intro to the song "Try Again" is used as the theme music for Richard Herring's Leicester Square Theatre Podcast.

References

External links
Ninja Tune website
Adrian Josey's site Saffrolla Sounds Record Label
Matt Chandler's website
Ben Mallott's website

Ninja Tune artists
English electronic music groups